Consolea is a genus of cactus, named after Italian botanist Michelangelo Console. The genus is native to the Caribbean and Florida. It has 10 accepted species. Members of this genus consist of trees up to 10 m in height; they are dioecious or subdioecious.

Accepted species 
, Plants of the World Online accepted 10 species:

References

Opuntioideae genera
Opuntioideae